Reid Morden, CM (born June 17, 1941) was the director of the Canadian Security Intelligence Service from 1988-1992. From 1991-1994, Morden served as Deputy Minister of Foreign Affairs. He was made a Member of the Order of Canada in 1999.

Education
Morden graduated from Dalhousie University in 1963 with a Bachelor of Laws. He later received an Honorary Doctorate of Law from Dalhousie.

Career
Morden started his career with the Canadian Department of External Affairs.  His first posting was in Pakistan.  From 1991-1994, Morden served as Deputy Minister of Foreign Affairs.

Morden was named director of CSIS in 1988, and served in that capacity for four years. While there, he oversaw the destruction of security files for John Diefenbaker, Lester B. Pearson and Pierre Elliott Trudeau on 30 January 1989.

Later he caused a stir by defending former director Ted Finn's erasing of 156 tapes of evidence before the Air India Inquiry.

In addition, Morden has served as President of Atomic Energy of Canada Limited1994-1998, and worked in the private sector with Kroll and KPMG Forensic Inc 2000-.  In 2000 Morden received the Order of Canada.  In June 2005, Morden was appointed to assist the commission of inquiry dealing with the case of Maher Arar.

Today he runs the security analysis firm Reid Morden & Associates, while
acting as Executive Director of the Volcker Inquiry into the United Nations' Oil-for-Food Programme. He is also a Director of the HSLA industry trade group.  Morden sits on the Board of Governors for Trent University, and is an advisor to the Schulich School of Business' MBA program.  Morden is a Grand Officer of the Order of the Southern Cross.

References

Living people
Directors of the Canadian Security Intelligence Service
Dalhousie University alumni
Schulich School of Law alumni
1941 births